Port Hope railway station in Port Hope, Ontario, Canada, is one of the oldest Canadian passenger rail stations still in active use. Served by Via Rail trains running from Toronto to Kingston and Ottawa, it was also a stop for trains to and from Montreal until January 24, 2012.  The station is unstaffed, but has a heated waiting room, pay telephone, washrooms, free outdoor parking, and wheelchair access.

Railway services
As of January 2023, Port Hope is served by one domestic route (with connections). Departures that have been reduced by the COVID-19 pandemic have been gradually restored over time.

 No local service is provided between Ottawa and Fallowfield, or Guildwood and Toronto on these trains.

History 

The station, built from local limestone as part of the 1856 Grand Trunk Railway, opened on the October 27, 1856 inauguration of Montreal–Toronto mainline service. Architecturally, its Italianate design is typical of many of the 34 stations originally on the main line. Of the (at most) nine original stations still extant, just Port Hope, Napanee (1856) and Georgetown (1858) remain in active use.

A speculative boom fuelled construction and rail building in the region in the 1850s and 1860s. Port Hope and nearby Cobourg, both small towns, each vied to open a feeder rail line north to Peterborough to promote their respective lake ports. In 1906, both the Midland Railway of Canada and the Grand Trunk Railway had multiple buildings in Port Hope, including freight and car repair facilities, operating several spur lines to the harbour wharves. Much of this infrastructure was redundant as, by 1893, all of the rival companies had been acquired by Grand Trunk. The GTR was ultimately bankrupted by an ill-fated expansion westward and merged into the Canadian National Railway in 1923. Via Rail has operated Canada's federal passenger service since 1978.

A 1978 CN proposal to close or remove Port Hope station drew strong local opposition. Port Hope Town Council obtained a partnership with the Architectural Conservancy of Ontario, the Ontario Heritage Foundation, CN/Via and the province to use public funds and the money CN had earmarked for construction of a new shelter to instead retain and restore the original station to its 1881 appearance, returning it to passenger use. It was designated as a heritage railway station by the Historic Sites and Monuments Board of Parks Canada in 1992.

In 2009, Via Rail constructed an additional 20 parking spaces at the station; primarily geared towards the regular commuters that use Via Rail service at the station to access the Greater Toronto area.

References

External links

Via Rail stations in Ontario
Railway stations in Canada opened in 1856
Railway stations in Northumberland County, Ontario
Canadian National Railway stations in Ontario
Designated heritage railway stations in Ontario